Soraya Lateh (Thai:โสรยา ลาเต๊ะ, born 15 March 1999) is a Thai cricketer. She played for the Thailand women's national cricket team in the 2017 Women's Cricket World Cup Qualifier in February 2017. She made her Women's Twenty20 International (WT20I) debut for Thailand on 24 February 2019, in the 2019 ICC Women's Qualifier Asia.

In August 2019, she was named in Thailand's squad for the 2019 ICC Women's World Twenty20 Qualifier tournament in Scotland. In January 2020, she was named in Thailand's squad for the 2020 ICC Women's T20 World Cup in Australia.

References

External links
 

1999 births
Living people
Soraya Lateh
Soraya Lateh
Soraya Lateh
Soraya Lateh
Southeast Asian Games medalists in cricket
Competitors at the 2017 Southeast Asian Games
Soraya Lateh